Miklós "Miki" Fehér (20 July 1979 – 25 January 2004) was a Hungarian professional footballer who played as a striker.

He spent most of his nine-year career in Portugal, representing four clubs and amassing Primeira Liga totals of 80 games and 27 goals. On 25 January 2004, he died of a cardiac arrest during a match between Vitória de Guimarães and his team Benfica in Guimarães.

Fehér represented Hungary national team at international level, making his debut in 1998 at the age of 19.

Club career
Born in Tatabánya, Fehér started his playing career at Győri ETO FC, where he was spotted by FC Porto scouts. He was signed in 1998 but never really made a breakthrough onto the first team, being loaned to gain experience from ages 20 to 21 to another two northern sides, S.C. Salgueiros and S.C. Braga.

At Braga, Fehér had his best professional season, scoring 14 Primeira Liga goals in 26 games in 2000–01. After Porto chairman Jorge Nuno Pinto da Costa quarrelled with his agent José Veiga, the player refused to part with the latter and left, joining Lisbon side S.L. Benfica and going on to net eight official goals over two seasons.

Death and legacy

On 25 January 2004, Fehér was in Guimarães with Benfica to play against Vitória de Guimarães. The game was being broadcast live on television, and Benfica were leading 1–0. Fehér had just come on as a substitute and assisted another player just off the bench, Fernando Aguiar, for the match's only goal, but received a yellow card in injury time and suddenly bent forward, seemingly in pain; he then fell backwards to the ground.

Members of both teams rushed immediately to aid Fehér before medical personnel arrived on the pitch. Cardiopulmonary resuscitation was performed, an ambulance arrived on the pitch and he was rushed to the hospital. His condition was covered by the Portuguese media throughout the day and, before midnight, his death was confirmed, the cause of death being cardiac arrhythmia brought on by hypertrophic cardiomyopathy. In his memory Benfica retired the number 29 shirt, which he wore during his time at the club. He was remembered by many and his death caused a profound shock in Portuguese sports. Among others, Porto director of football Reinaldo Teles and manager José Mourinho paid their respects at the Estádio da Luz, where the player's body remained before his burial in his native Hungary.

Benfica's delegation, which included president Luís Filipe Vieira, coach Giovanni Trapattoni and the entire first-team squad, travelled to Hungary, presenting Fehér's parents with the 2004–05 league championship medal, in respect for the player and his time with the club. They had previously dedicated the 2003–04 Taça de Portugal trophy to him. 

On 9 October 2009, the day before their 2010 FIFA World Cup qualifier against Portugal in Lisbon, the Hungary national team squad laid a wreath next to a metal bust of Fehér at Benfica's homeground, in tribute to his memory. Before a UEFA Europa Conference League game at the ground where he died, Hungarian club Puskás Akadémia FC paid tribute to him on 20 July 2022, which would have been his 43rd birthday.

International career
Fehér earned his first cap for the Hungary national team on 10 October 1998, in a UEFA Euro 2000 qualifying match against Azerbaijan. He came on as a sixth-minute substitute for Ferenc Horváth at the Tofiq Bahramov Stadium in Baku, and scored the final goal of the 4–0 win.

On 11 October 2000, Fehér netted a hat-trick in a 6–1 away rout of Lithuania for the 2002 FIFA World Cup qualifiers. In total, he scored seven goals in 25 appearances.

Career statistics

Club

International

Scores and results list Hungary's goal tally first, score column indicates score after each Fehér goal.

Honours
Porto
 Primeira Liga: 1998–99
 Taça de Portugal: 1999–2000
 Supertaça Cândido de Oliveira: 1998, 1999

Benfica
 Taça de Portugal: 2003–04

Individual
 Young Hungarian Player of the Year: 1997
 Ferenc Puskás Award: 2000

See also
 List of association footballers who died while playing

References

External links

 
 

1979 births
2004 deaths
People from Tatabánya
Sportspeople from Komárom-Esztergom County
Hungarian footballers
Association football forwards
Nemzeti Bajnokság I players
Győri ETO FC players
Primeira Liga players
Segunda Divisão players
FC Porto players
FC Porto B players
S.C. Salgueiros players
S.C. Braga players
S.L. Benfica footballers
Hungary under-21 international footballers
Hungary international footballers
Hungarian expatriate footballers
Expatriate footballers in Portugal
Hungarian expatriate sportspeople in Portugal
Association football players who died while playing
Sport deaths in Portugal
Filmed deaths in sports
Deaths from cardiomyopathy